Greenwood Lake is a lake in Lake County, in the U.S. state of Minnesota.

Greenwood Lake was named for George C. Greenwood, a pioneer merchant. In 2021, the Greenwood Fire began near the lake and was named after it.

See also
List of lakes in Minnesota

References

Lakes of Minnesota
Lakes of Lake County, Minnesota